Ciarán Hyland is a Gaelic footballer from County Wicklow, Ireland. He plays with the Wicklow intercounty team with whom he won a Tommy Murphy Cup medal in 2007. He won €124,000 during an appearance on the National Lottery's summer scratch-card TV game show The Big Money Game in 2009. In September 2009 Hyland was nominated for a GAA All Star Award, along with Wicklow teammate Leighton Glynn.  In 2012 he was part of the Wicklow team that won the National League Div 4 title scoring a goal in the win over Fermanagh.
In the summer of 2018 Hyland decided to call time on his inter-county football career after playing for 16years.

References

Year of birth missing (living people)
Living people
Arklow Geraldines Ballymoney Gaelic footballers
Wicklow inter-county Gaelic footballers